Bradley Joseph Cottam (born November 28, 1984) is a former American football tight end who played for the Kansas City Chiefs of the National Football League.

Early years / Personal
He played high school football at Evangelical Christian School in Cordova, Tennessee. He backed up eagle great Michael Shea during the 2000 state championship run. 

His younger brother Jeff Cottam also went to Tennessee and was signed by the Cincinnati Bengals as an undrafted free agent in 2010.

Brad married the former Lauren Hawks of Overland Park, KS on July 9, 2011.

Career
Cottam played college football at Tennessee. He was drafted by the Chiefs in the third round, 76th overall, of the 2008 NFL Draft. After three injury-filled seasons with the Chiefs, he was released on July 29, 2011.  For his NFL career (2008-09), Cottam caught 16 passes for 183 yard (an 11.4 yards-per-catch average) and no touchdowns.

References

External links
Kansas City Chiefs bio
Tennessee Volunteers bio

1984 births
Living people
People from Germantown, Tennessee
Players of American football from Tennessee
American football tight ends
Tennessee Volunteers football players
Kansas City Chiefs players